Kenneth Kester (March 16, 1936 – February 17, 2018) was a Republican member of the Colorado Senate, representing the 2nd district from 2003 to 2011. Previously he was a member of the Colorado House of Representatives from 1998 to 2002.

He was a General Motors auto dealer for 30 years. He was the father of three sons, Dan, Mike and Ed and a grandfather of two grandchildren.

Legislative career 
Kester had the largest district, geographically. Senator Kester previously served as a Bent County Commissioner. He served in the Colorado State House from 1999 to 2003, serving the counties of Baca, Bent, Crowley, Las Animas, Otero, and Huerfano.  In 2002 he was elected to represent the people of Senate District 2.

He served on the Agriculture, Natural Resources committee and for a time was the ranking Republican member of the Local Government & Energy committee.

Kester's main focus was on lowering the state income tax, strengthening education and agricultural products and promoting small business.

References

External links
Colorado General Assembly - Kenneth Kester official government website
Project Vote Smart - Senator Kenneth H. 'Ken' Kester (CO) profile
Follow the Money - Kenneth Kester
2006 2004 2002 2000 1998 campaign contributions

1936 births
2018 deaths
County commissioners in Colorado
Republican Party Colorado state senators
Republican Party members of the Colorado House of Representatives
People from Lamar, Colorado
Businesspeople from Colorado
20th-century American businesspeople